Erhan Aydın (born 13 February 1981) is a Turkish retired footballer who played as a winger.

Career
Born in Berlin, Aydın began playing football for SV Werder Bremen II. He moved to Turkey and joined Turkish Super League side Ankaraspor. He only made three league appearances for Ankaraspor, and ended his career with Gölcükspor in the TFF Third League.

References

External links

Guardian's Stats Centre

1981 births
Living people
Turkish footballers
German people of Turkish descent
Ankaraspor footballers
Süper Lig players
Association football midfielders